Maya Matouk (born 30 March 1998) is a Trinidadian footballer who plays as a forward for the Trinidad and Tobago national team.

International career
Matouk represented Trinidad and Tobago at the 2015 CONCACAF Women's U-20 Championship qualification, as well as many other tournaments. Matouk led T&T in their 6–0 defeat of Dominica in the CFU. At senior level, she played the 2020 CONCACAF Women's Olympic Qualifying Championship qualification.

References

External links

1998 births
Living people
Women's association football forwards
Women's association football midfielders
Trinidad and Tobago women's footballers
Sportspeople from Port of Spain
Trinidad and Tobago people of Lebanese descent
Sportspeople of Lebanese descent
Trinidad and Tobago women's international footballers
IMG Academy alumni
College women's soccer players in the United States
University of Tampa alumni
Trinidad and Tobago expatriate women's footballers
Trinidad and Tobago expatriate sportspeople in the United States
Expatriate women's soccer players in the United States